Rulon is the trade name for a family of PTFE plastics produced by Saint-Gobain Performance Plastics. Rulon plastics are known for their low coefficient of friction, excellent abrasion resistance, wide range of operating temperatures, and chemical inertness. Common applications for Rulon include seals, piston rings, bearings, and electrical insulation.

History
Rulon, not to be confused with Mulon, was produced by Dixon Industries Corporation in 1952 and named after its then President, Robert Rulon-Miller. This first type of Rulon was dubbed "Rulon A" (which was later replaced with type AR). Dixon was then bought by the Furon company. Furon was purchased by Saint-Gobain Performance Plastics.

Properties and types
There are many different types of Rulon produced for specific applications. These include:

Rulon A, obsolete
Rulon AR, maroon, used for seals & stronger than Rulon LR
Rulon LR, maroon, has low deformation characteristics
Rulon J, gold, polymer filled for more abrasion resistance and softer mating surface
Rulon 641, white, U.S. Food and Drug Administration compliant
Rulon W2, used in fresh water applications
Rulon 123, FDA compliant with low and consistent friction characteristics
Rulon 488, inorganic filler used for compatibility with most surfaces
Rulon 957, green speckled, bearing grade with noise dampening characteristics
Rulon XL, tan, low friction; suitable for aluminium; excellent outgassing characteristics for use in vacuums
Rulon F, green, polymer filled with excellent anti-abrasion characteristics
Rulon 142, aqua, low deformation material for used in linear bearings and slides
Rulon 945, black, very low deformation characteristics for use in high heat and impact applications
Rulon 1045, gold, highly elastic and moderately deformable for use as bearings, rings and seals
Rulon 1337, tan, FDA compliant with low coefficient of friction and excellent chemical resistance
Rulon 1410, gold, highly elastic
Rulon 1439, white, FDA compliant for use in submerged applications with low wear characteristics

Rulon A has a 1000 fold increase in wear resistance as compared to PTFE. However, it machines much like PTFE. It can also be moulded, extruded, skived, stamped, and hot and cold formed. Below is a table of properties pertaining to Rulon AR, but note that the other types of Rulon have similar properties.

References

Plastic brands
Fluoropolymers